The 13 amendments proposed by Makarios III (also known as 13 points) was a proposal by president of Cyprus Archbishop Makarios in 1963 for constitutional changes that altered the ways in which the two communities were represented in the government. This sparked a crisis between the Greek and Turkish Cypriots which led to the conflict known as 1963 Intercommunal strife.

The thirteen amendments

Below are the thirteen amendments that were proposed by Makarios.

 The right of veto of the President and the Vice-President of the Republic to be abandoned.
 The vice-president of the Republic to deputise for the president of the Republic in case of his temporary absence or incapacity to perform his duties.
 The Greek president of the House of Representatives and the Turkish vice-president to be elected by the House as a whole and not as at present the president by the Greek members of the House and the vice-president by the Turkish members of the House.
 The vice-president of the House of Representatives to deputise for the president of the House in case of his temporary absence or incapacity to perform his duties.
 The constitutional provisions regarding separate majorities for enactment of certain laws by the House of Representatives to be abolished.
 Unified municipalities to be established.
 The administration of justice to be unified.
 The division of the security forces into police and gendarmerie to be abolished.
 The numerical strength of the security forces and of the defence forces to be determined by a law.
 The proportion of the participation of Greek and Turkish Cypriots in the composition of the public service and the forces of the republic to be modified in proportion to the ratio of the population of Greek and Turkish Cypriots.
 The number of the members of the Public Service Commission to be reduced from ten to five.
 All decisions of the Public Service Commission to be taken by simple majority.
 The Greek Communal Chamber to be abolished.

The most serious constitutional problem the newly established Cyprus Republic faced in daily-life politics was the municipal issue. Turkish Cypriots strived for the creation of separate municipals for Greeks and Turks, while Greek Cypriots aimed for mixed ones. Makarios took into consideration the probability of changing the constitution unilaterally, and despite warnings of constitutional collapse from the Turkish Republic, Greek Foreign Minister Evangelos Averoff and his cabinet minister Glafkos Clerides, he proceeded with the changes. Makarios calculated the political instability of Turkey and Greece, and he also believed that his proposal would be backed by the United Nations. On the 30th of November 1963, Makarios handed a memo of 13 points to the Turkish Cypriot side.

Kucuk, Denktash, and the Turkish Government rejected the 13 amendments. Turkish Cypriots filed a lawsuit against the 13 amendments in the Supreme Constitutional Court of Cyprus (SCCC).

See also
Akritas plan

References

Sources 

 
 
 
 
 

Political history of Cyprus
Turkish invasion of Cyprus
1963 in Cyprus
1963 documents